Phrynarachne is a genus of crab spiders first described by Tamerlan Thorell in 1869.

Species
, the World Spider Catalog accepted the following 35 species:

Phrynarachne bimaculata Thorell, 1895 – Myanmar
Phrynarachne brevis Tang & Li, 2010 – China
Phrynarachne ceylonica (O. Pickard-Cambridge, 1884) – India, Sri Lanka to China, Taiwan, Japan
Phrynarachne cheesmanae (Berland, 1938) – Vanuatu
Phrynarachne clavigera Simon, 1903 – Madagascar
Phrynarachne coerulescens (Doleschall, 1859) – Java
Phrynarachne cucullata Simon, 1886 – Cambodia, Vietnam, Moluccas
Phrynarachne decipiens (Forbes, 1883) – Malaysia, Java, Sumatra
Phrynarachne dissimilis (Doleschall, 1859) – Java
Phrynarachne dreepy Lin & Li, 2022 – China
Phrynarachne fatalis O. Pickard-Cambridge, 1899 – Sri Lanka
Phrynarachne gracilipes Pavesi, 1895 – Ethiopia
Phrynarachne huangshanensis Li, Chen & Song, 1985 – China
Phrynarachne jobiensis (Thorell, 1877) – New Guinea
Phrynarachne kannegieteri Hasselt, 1893 – Sumatra
Phrynarachne katoi Chikuni, 1955 – China, Korea, Japan
Phrynarachne lancea Tang & Li, 2010 – China
Phrynarachne mammillata Song, 1990 – China
Phrynarachne marmorata Pocock, 1899 – Equatorial Guinea
Phrynarachne melloleitaoi Lessert, 1933 – Angola
Phrynarachne olivacea Jézéquel, 1964 – Ivory Coast
Phrynarachne papulata Thorell, 1891 – Myanmar
Phrynarachne papulata aspera Thorell, 1895 – Myanmar
Phrynarachne peeliana (Stoliczka, 1869) – India
Phrynarachne pusiola Simon, 1903 – Madagascar
Phrynarachne rothschildi Pocock & Rothschild, 1903 – Sri Lanka
Phrynarachne rubroperlata Simon, 1907 – West Africa
Phrynarachne rugosa (Latreille, 1804) (type species) – West Africa, Malawi, Madagascar, Mauritius, Réunion
Phrynarachne tuberculata Rainbow, 1899 – New Guinea
Phrynarachne tuberosa (Blackwall, 1864) – India
Phrynarachne tuberosula (Karsch, 1880) – West Africa
Phrynarachne xuxiake Lin & Li, 2022 – China
Phrynarachne yunhui Lin & Li, 2022 – Hainan
Phrynarachne zhengzhongi Lin & Li, 2022 – China

References

Thomisidae
Thomisidae genera
Spiders of Asia
Spiders of Africa
Taxa named by Tamerlan Thorell